GIHE may refer to:
Gawharshad institute of higher education
Glion Institute of Higher Education